Alice Morgan is the name of:
Alice Morgan Person (1840–1913), maiden name Alice Morgan, American patent medicine entrepreneur
Alice Morgan (Luther), fictional character played by Ruth Wilson
Alice Morgan (1865–1933), wife of American diplomat John R. Carter
Alice Morgan (–1951), British woman murdered by James Inglis
Alice Mary Morgan (1850–1890), married name of English painter and illustrator Alice Havers

See also
Alice Morgan Wright (1881–1975), American sculptor and suffragist